Atrian may refer to

 Atrian, a member of the extraterrestrial species on the U.S. TV series Star-Crossed
 Atrian, someone from the planet Atrios in the fourth Doctor Who story The Armageddon Factor
 Adrian or Atrian, relating to Adria, a town in Italy 
 Atrian, relating to Atri, Abruzzo or the ancient Adria in Italy  
 Adria (river), a river in Italy 
 Atrian Ladore, a participant in Athletics at the 2002 Micronesian Games